Bad Laasphe is a town in North Rhine-Westphalia, Germany, in the Siegen-Wittgenstein district.

Geography

Location
The town of Bad Laasphe lies in the upper Lahn Valley, near the stately home of Wittgenstein Castle (de) (nowadays a boarding school) in the former Wittgenstein district. The municipal area is located south of the main crest of the Rothaargebirge, and borders in the north on the towns of Bad Berleburg and Erndtebrück, in the east on the town of Biedenkopf in Hessen, in the southeast on Breidenbach, in the south on Dietzhölztal and in the west on the town of Netphen. Bad Laasphe lies about 30 km east of Siegen and 25 km northwest of Marburg.

The highest elevation in the municipal area rises to 694 m. It lies southwest of the main town at the outlying centre of Heiligenborn.

Constituent communities

Each one of the following centres is part of the town of Bad Laasphe:

History
In 1888, the town of Laasphe lay in the Prussian administrative region of Arnsberg in Wittgenstein district and was connected to the Kreuzthal-Marburg line of the Prussian State Railway (Preußische Staatsbahn). In 1888 Laasphe had a junior teachers' college, a local court and knitwear and hosiery factories. In 1885, Laasphe had 2225 mostly Evangelical inhabitants. Schloss Wittgenstein owned two ironworks. (From Meyers Konversations-Lexikon)

Since 1960, Laasphe has been a Kneipp spa. On 1 January 1984 the town became a Kneipp curative spa for its mild climate, and since then has been called Bad Laasphe.

Government

The results of the local council elections in May 2014 were:

Coat of arms
Bad Laasphe's civic coat of arms might heraldically be described thus: In sable a town wall with open gate tower argent flanked by two crenellated towers argent, between which an inescutcheon in argent two pallets sable.

A stamping of the town's seal from the 14th century has been preserved, which shows the same composition as the arms shown here. The inescutcheon (smaller shield within the main one) bears the same arms as the town's former overlords, the Counts of Wittgenstein. When the arms were revised in 1908, the town came up with another composition which looked the same, but the inescutcheon, owing to a misunderstanding, was rather different, being quartered with two opposite quarters showing in gules (red) a castle argent (silver), and in the two other quarters the Wittgenstein pallets. The castle charge was a modern addition and related to the Wittgensteins' overlordship in Homburg. The town archive suggested even then that the inescutcheon bear the old Wittgenstein arms as seen in the town's oldest known seal, but no decision was made about it at that time. Only in 1936 did the town finally decide to revert to the composition shown in the old seal. This was confirmed as the town's arms on 10 March 1937.

Twin towns
  Tamworth, Staffordshire, England, United Kingdom, since 10 October 1980
  Châteauneuf-sur-Loire, France, since 28 September 1991

Notable people

 Ludwig Crocius (1586–1655), preacher, professor at Bremen  School Illustre 
 Friedrich Kiel, (1821–1885), composer
 Wilhelm Pauck (1901–1981), Protestant church historian
 Rudolf Jung (1907–1973), writer and translator
 Fritz Heinrich, (1921–1959), German politician (SPD), Member of the Bundestag
 Otto Piene, (1928–2014), painter and artist
 Fritz Roth, born 1955, actor and musician

References

External links
 Official site 
 Bad Laasphe in the Kulturatlas Westfalen (with 360° panoramas)
 Old and new town arms at International Civic Heraldry

Towns in North Rhine-Westphalia
Siegen-Wittgenstein
Spa towns in Germany